Libertador General José de San Martín Airport  is located  southwest of the center of Posadas, a city in the Misiones Province of Argentina. The airport covers an area of 329 hectares (813 acres) and is operated by Aeropuertos Argentina 2000

Airlines and destinations

Statistics

Accidents and incidents 
On June 12, 1988, Austral Líneas Aéreas Flight 046 undershot the runway, resulting in 22 deaths.

See also

Transport in Argentina
List of airports in Argentina

References

External links 
Posadas, PSS at Aeropuertos Argentina 2000 (official web site)

Airports in Argentina